The Six Nations Arrows are Canadian Junior "A" box lacrosse team from Ohsweken, Ontario on the Six Nations of the Grand River Reserve.  The Arrows play in the OLA Junior A Lacrosse League.

In 2021, the Arrows announced that they'd be leaving the OLA for a new league, the Tewaaraton Lacrosse League.

History

Six Nations Braves 1974 - 1979
Six Nations Arrows 1980 to Present

*2012 Season: The Ontario Lacrosse League implements a goals for/goals against ruling when two teams are tied with the same number of points at the end of the season, AND those two teams have split the outcomes of their own games equally. Six Nations outscored Whitby by 2 goals between their two games, hence giving Six Nations the 1st place seed in the tie-break and the 1st overall seed in the OLA-A standings.

*2016 Season: The Arrows organization forfeit four games due ineligible player, Oliver Bolsterli - former property of the London Blue Devils.  Bolsterli played seven games for the Arrows; however, the Blue Devils did not register him as an active OLA player until June 20.  The Arrows appealed the League's decision.  On July 14 the Arrows won their appeal, as the ruling was ultimately overturned by the Ontario Lacrosse Association; the Arrows finish 1st overall for the fifth straight season.

Season-by-season results
Note: GP = Games played, W = Wins, L = Losses, T = Ties, Pts = Points, GF = Goals for, GA = Goals against

References

External links
Arrows Webpage
The Bible of Lacrosse
Unofficial OLA Page

Ontario Lacrosse Association teams
Lacrosse of the Iroquois Confederacy
Six Nations of the Grand River